Isothamnis is a genus of moths in the family Sesiidae.

Species
Isothamnis prisciformis (Meyrick, 1935)

References

Sesiidae